Gettin' Lucky by Head East was released in 1977 on A&M Records. Along with Flat as a Pancake and Head East Live!, it is one of their most renowned releases. The album peaked at No. 136 on the Billboard pop albums chart.

This album was re-released together with Head East on CD as a double album.

Personnel
 Roger Boyd - keyboards/vocals
 Steve Huston - drums/vocals
 Mike Somerville - guitar/vocals
 Dan Birney - bass
 John Schlitt- lead vocals

Track listing 
 "Gettin' Lucky" (Huston, Somerville)
 "Back in My Own Hands" (Birney, Somerville)
 "Show Me I'm Alive" (Birney)
 "Take It on Home" (Huston)
 "Dancer Road" (Birney)
 "Don't Let Me Sleep in the Morning" (Somerville)
 "Sands of Time" (R Boyd)
 "Call to Arms and Legs" (L Boyd, Huston)
 "Time Has a Way" (Huston)
 "Every Little Bit of My Heart" (Boyd, Schlitt)

References

1977 albums
Head East albums